Gabrovnitsa may refer to:

 In Bulgaria (written in Cyrillic as Габровница):
 Gabrovnitsa, Montana Province - a village in Montana municipality, Montana Province
 Gabrovnitsa, Sofia Province - a village in Svoge municipality, Sofia Province